Kenneth Child (6 March 1916 – 25 October 1983) was  Archdeacon of Sudbury from 1970 until his death.

Child was educated at  Queen Elizabeth Grammar School, Wakefield and the University of Leeds. After a period of study at the College of the Resurrection, Mirfield he was ordained in 1942. His first post  was a  curacy at  Tonge Moor. He was a Chaplain to the Forces from 1944 to 1947 when he returned to Tonge Moor as its Vicar. He was Chaplain of Guy’s Hospital from 1955 to 1959 when he became Rector of Newmarket, a post he held for ten years; also serving as its Rural Dean from 1963. He was then appointed  Rector of  The Thurlows with Little Bradley; and an Archdeacon the following year.

References

1916 births
1983 deaths
People educated at Queen Elizabeth Grammar School, Wakefield
Alumni of the University of Leeds
Alumni of the College of the Resurrection
Archdeacons of Sudbury